Definitive Collection is a compilation album from Scottish singer-songwriter Donovan. It was released in the Netherlands (Epic 480552 9) and Austria (Sony 480552 9) on 7 November 1995.

History
Three years after the appearance of Troubadour: The Definitive Collection 1964-1976, Epic Records (now a Sony subsidiary) issued another two disc compilation titled Definitive Collection in Europe.  The album contained many songs that had not yet appeared on any compact disc.  The live recording of "Universal Soldier" was originally released on Rising. The second disc featured songs taken from Donovan in Concert.

Track listing
All tracks by Donovan Leitch.

Disc one
"Sunshine Superman"
"Season of the Witch"
"Mellow Yellow"
"Epistle to Dippy"
"There Is a Mountain"
"Wear Your Love Like Heaven"
"Jennifer Juniper"
"Hurdy Gurdy Man"
"Laleña"
"Atlantis"
"To Susan on the West Coast Waiting"
"Barabajagal (Love Is Hot)"
"Riki Tiki Tavi"
"Celia of the Seals"
"Sailing Homeward"
"Earth Sign Man"
"Maria Magenta"
"Salvation Stomp"
"Colours"
"Catch the Wind"
"Universal Soldier" (live)

Disc two
"The Fat Angel" (live)
"Isle of Islay" (live)
"There Is a Mountain" (live)
"Guinevere" (live)
"Celeste" (live)
"Mellow Yellow" (live)

External links
 Definitive Collection – Donovan Unofficial Site

1995 compilation albums
Donovan compilation albums
Albums produced by Mickie Most
Albums produced by Norbert Putnam